Season 11 of the American competitive reality television series Hell's Kitchen  premiered on March 12, 2013 on Fox.

Executive chef Ja'Nel Witt won the competition and received a head chef position at Gordon Ramsay Pub & Grill in Caesars Palace at Las Vegas, but was denied the position a month after winning for "unforeseen personal circumstances". As of June 2014, she holds a position as the executive chef of Corner Table, a canteen based in River Oaks, Houston. 

Jon Scallion, who finished third and was deemed by Ramsay as the only great chef in the worst team in Hell's Kitchen history, became sous chef at Gordon Ramsay Steak under season 10 winner Christina Wilson.

Staff
Gordon Ramsay returned as head chef as well as Andi Van Willigan as the red team's sous chef. Long-time maître d' Jean-Philippe Susilovic returned for the first time since season 7 due to his work commitments at Ramsay's London restaurant, Pétrus. However, previous blue team sous chef Scott Leibfried did not return due to his work obligation at Fleetwood's restaurant in Maui and was replaced by newcomer James Avery from Wall, New Jersey.

Chefs
For the first time ever, 20 chefs competed in season 11.

Contestant progress

Episodes

Notes

References

Hell's Kitchen (American TV series)
2013 American television seasons